A family is a domestic or social group.

Family or The Family may also refer to:

Mathematics
Family of curves, a set of curves resulting from a function with variable parameters
Family of sets, a collection of sets
Indexed family, a family where each element can be given an index
Normal family, a collection of continuous functions
Parametric family, a family where elements are specified by a set of parameters

Religion
Holy Family of the Child Jesus, the Virgin Mary, and Saint Joseph
Family International, a religious movement formerly called the Children of God
The Family (Australian New Age group), a controversial Australian religious group
The Family (Christian political organization), or The Fellowship, a Washington, D.C.-based U.S. Christian group
"The Family: A Proclamation to the World", a 1995 statement issued by the Church of Jesus Christ of Latter-day Saints

Science 
Family (biology), a level of scientific classification for organisms
Family (periodic table), a group in the periodic table of elements
Gene family, a set of similar genes resulting from gene duplications
Protein family, a set of similar proteins resulting from gene duplications
Tornado family, a series of tornadoes spawned by the same storm cell

Linguistics  
Language family, a group of languages related through descent from a common ancestral language

Arts, entertainment, and media

Art 
The Family (Schiele), a 1918 oil painting by Egon Schiele
A Family (painting), a 1951 oil on canvas by Louis le Brocquy
The Family (Gross), a 1979 bronze sculpture in Manhattan, New York
The Family (Puccetti), a 1982 steel statue in West Allis, Wisconsin
Family (Blumenfeld), a 1983 public artwork by Helaine Blumenfeld, in Milwaukee, Wisconsin, U.S.

Films 
A Family (1943 film), a 1943 Soviet film
The Family (1970 film) or Città violenta, an Italian crime film directed by Sergio Sollima
The Family (1972 film), an Ivorian film directed by Henri Duparc
The Family (1987 film) or La famiglia, an Italian film directed by Ettore Scola
Family (1996 film), a 1996 Telugu drama
Family (2001 film), a Takashi Miike film
Family (2001 Dutch film), a 2001 Dutch drama
A Family (2004 film), a South Korean film starring Soo Ae
Family (2006 film), an Indian Hindi film
A Family (2010 film), a Danish drama
The Family (2013 film), a French action comedy directed by Luc Besson
Families (2015 film), a French film

The Family (2017 film), a Venezuelan film
A Family (2017 film), an Italian film
Family (2018 film), an American film

Literature  
The Family (Shimazaki novel), 1911
The Family (Ba Jin novel), 1933
The Family, a 1971 book by Ed Sanders
A Family, a 1978 play by Ronald Harwood
The Family (Buchi Emecheta novel) (U.S.) or Gwendolen (UK), 1989
Family (Cooper novel), 1991
The Family (Puzo novel), 2001
The Family: The Real Story of the Bush Dynasty, a 2004 book by Kitty Kelley
The Family: The Secret Fundamentalism at the Heart of American Power, a 2008 book by Jeff Sharlet

Music

Groups
Family (band), a 1966–73 English rock band
Family (Spanish band), a 1990s pop band
Family (Willie Nelson's band), Willie Nelson's recording and touring group
The Family (band), an American R&B band formed by Prince
The Family (songwriters), a Swedish songwriting and music production team
The Family, an urban contemporary gospel choir led by Kirk Franklin

Albums 
Family (Ignite album), 1995
Family (LeAnn Rimes album), 2007
Family (Le Loup album), 2009
Family (May J. album), 2009
Family (Noah Gundersen EP), 2011
Family (Think About Life album), 2009
Family (Thompson album), 2014
The Family (Brockhampton album), 2022
The Family (The Family album), by the R&B band, 1985
The Family (Mashmakhan album), 1971
The Family, an album by Satchel, 1996

Songs 
"Family" (The Chainsmokers and Kygo song), 2019
"Family", by Björk from Vulnicura
"Family", by Ed Sheeran from No. 5 Collaborations Project
"Family", by Joe Walsh from Analog Man
"Family", by Hed PE from New World Orphans
"Family", by the Rolling Stones from Metamorphosis
"Family", by S Club 3
"Family", by TobyMac from Eye on It

Television

Channels 
ABC Family (now Freeform), a U.S. television network
Family Channel (Canadian TV network), a Canadian kids' channel
TVNZ Family, a programming block on TVNZ 6, New Zealand

Series 
Family (1976 TV series), a 1976–80 U.S. drama series
Family (1994 TV series), an Irish miniseries by Roddy Doyle
Family (2003 TV series), a British crime drama
Family (2012 TV series), a South Korean sitcom
#Family (2018 TV series), a Ugandan sitcom
Families (TV series), a 1990–93 British daytime soap opera
The Family (1971 TV series), a 1971 Canadian drama television series
The Family (1974 TV series), a fly-on-the-wall documentary series
The Family (2003 TV series), a 2003 reality television show
The Family (2008 TV series), a documentary series following British families
The Family (2011 TV series), an Australian version of the British series
The Family (2016 TV series), an American thriller/drama series
The Family (miniseries), a 2019 documentary series

Episodes and segments 
"Family" (Buffy the Vampire Slayer)
"Family" (House)
"Family" (Masters of Horror), 2006
"Family" (Star Trek: The Next Generation)
"Family" (Stargate SG-1)
"Family" (The Secret Circle)
"The Family" (sketch), from The Carol Burnett Show

Other uses in arts, entertainment, and media
Family (musical instruments), a grouping of similar musical instruments
Family Radio, a non-commercial traditional religious broadcasting network in the United States
 The Family, a fictional group of aliens battled by the DC Comics character Metamorpho

Groups and organizations
Family (US Census), a group of related people residing together
The Family (American crime organization), an NJ African-American crime organization founded by Akbar Pray
The Family (Arkansas politics), a 19th-century American political coalition
The Family (club), a private club formed in San Francisco in 1901
"The Family", a group of 18th-century Carolina planters opposed by George Burrington
"The Family", a 2005–06 American terrorist cell arrested in Operation Backfire
"The Family", a gang responsible for The Family Murders in Adelaide, Australia.
Crime family, a name for crime organizations.
The Families, a gang in GTA San Andreas and GTA V.

See also
Familia (disambiguation)
Familial (disambiguation)
La Familia (disambiguation)

no:Familie#Andre betydninger